Ian Cowley (born 20 March 1937) is an Australian former cricketer. He played four first-class matches for Tasmania between 1960 and 1964.

See also
 List of Tasmanian representative cricketers
 The 1965-66 Victorian District Cricket final

References

External links
 

1937 births
Living people
Australian cricketers
Tasmania cricketers
Cricketers from Launceston, Tasmania